USNS Henson (T-AGS-63) is a  oceanographic survey ship. It is the fourth ship in the class.  Henson is named after Matthew Henson, who accompanied Robert Peary, most famously on an expedition intended to reach the Geographic North Pole in 1909.

The survey crew is composed of oceanographers from the Naval Oceanographic Office (NAVOCEANO) who planned and coordinated the U.S. Navy's participation in the search. Representatives from the U.S. Naval Academy, Office of Naval Research (ONR) and the Naval History and Heritage Command will also be aboard Henson to assist in the search and identification of found artifacts.

References

External links

  USNS Henson official web site

 

Pathfinder-class survey ships
Ships built in Pascagoula, Mississippi
1996 ships